Lazar Đokić (Cyrillic: Лазар Ђокић, born 16 May 1996) is a Montenegrin football attacker who plays for Swiss club NK Pajde Möhlin.

Club career
Born in Podgorica, he started playing with FK Mladost Podgorica in the 2014–15 Montenegrin First League. Then he moved to Serbia, where he played in several leveçs with several clubs. He played with FK Donji Srem, FK Zemun, FK Radnički Beograd, FK Spartak Subotica, FK Dinamo Vranje and FK Čukarički.

Ahead of the 2019–20 season, Đokić joined Swiss club NK Pajde Möhlin.

References

External links
Lazar Đokić at Footballdatabase
Lazar Đokić at NK Pajde Möhlin's website

1996 births
Living people
Footballers from Podgorica
Association football defenders
Montenegrin footballers
OFK Titograd players
FK Donji Srem players
FK Zemun players
FK Radnički Beograd players
FK Spartak Subotica players
FK Dinamo Vranje players
FK Čukarički players
FK Metalac Gornji Milanovac players
Montenegrin First League players
Serbian First League players
Serbian SuperLiga players
2. Liga Interregional players
Montenegrin expatriate footballers
Expatriate footballers in Serbia
Montenegrin expatriate sportspeople in Serbia
Expatriate footballers in Switzerland
Montenegrin expatriate sportspeople in Switzerland